Castrelo do Val is a municipality in Ourense in the Galicia region of north-west Spain. It is located towards the south-east of the province.

References  

Municipalities in the Province of Ourense